The Eighteenth Federal Electoral District of the Federal District (XVIII Distrito Electoral Federal del Distrito Federal) is one of the 300 Electoral Districts into which Mexico is divided for the purpose of elections to the federal Chamber of Deputies and one of 27 such districts in the Federal District ("DF" or Mexico City).

It elects one deputy to the lower house of Congress for each three-year legislative period, by means of the first past the post system.

District territory
Under the 2005 districting scheme, the DF's Eighteenth  District covers the northern portion of the borough (delegación) of Iztapalapa.

Previous districting schemes

1996–2005 district
Between 1996 and 2005, the 18th District was located in the same area, and covered practically the same area of Iztapalapa.

Deputies returned to Congress from this district

L Legislature
 1976–1979: Hugo Díaz Velázquez (PRI)
LI Legislature
 1979–1982: Leobardo Salgado Arroyo (PRI)
LII Legislature
 1982–1985: Joaquín del Olmo Reyes (PRI)
LIII Legislature
 1985–1988:
LIV Legislature
 1988–1991:
LV Legislature
 1991–1994:
LVI Legislature
 1994–1997: Armando Gamboa Enríquez (PRI)
LVII Legislature
 1997–2000: Ángel de la Rosa Blanco (PRD)
LVIII Legislature
 2000–2003: Raúl García Velázquez (PAN)
LIX Legislature
 2003–2006: Horacio Martínez Meza (PRD)
LX Legislature
 2006–2009: David Mendoza Arellano (PRD)

References and notes

Federal electoral districts of Mexico
Mexico City